Sólstafir is an Icelandic post-metal band formed in 1995 and currently signed to Season of Mist. Originally a black metal band, they transitioned to a post-metal-influenced style on their second album Masterpiece of Bitterness.

History
Sólstafir was formed in 1995 by guitarist/singer Aðalbjörn Tryggvason, bassist Halldór Einarsson, and drummer Guðmundur Óli Pálmason. The band's name is the Icelandic word for sun beams (crepuscular rays). They soon recorded the demos Í Norðri and Til Valhallar. Halldór then left the band, and Aðalbjörn and Guðmundur recorded a promo tape as a duo in 1997.

During this period, Svavar Austmann joined as the new bassist and the band began recording their debut full-length album, Í Blóði og Anda. The album was not released until 2002 due to various recording delays and label disputes. Shortly after that album was completed, second guitarist Sæþór Maríus Sæþórsson joined the band and made his debut on the 2002 demo Black Death.

After shopping around a three-track demo of new songs, Sólstafir signed with Spinefarm Records in 2005. Their second album Masterpiece of Bitterness was released by Spinefarm later that year. The album received positive reviews, with Metal Storm stating "the perfect mix of non-Metal elements with metal ones makes it a necessary album for any Metalhead looking for something that breaks the mold of pre-established genres."

Their third album Köld was recorded in Sweden and released in 2009. Reviewers compared the band's sound to Enslaved and Neurosis, among others, while noting their unique post-black metal sound. The album was also noted for its addition of atmospheric passages. Sólstafir began to tour Europe regularly in 2010 and made their first of many open-air appearances at the Roskilde Festival that year.

Sólstafir's fourth full-length album, Svartir Sandar, was released by Season of Mist in 2011. The song "Fjara" remained in the 2013 list of Iceland's top 100 songs of 20 years. This album signaled Sólstafir's retreat from black metal and move toward experimental atmospherics of the type practiced by fellow Icelanders Sigur Rós.

Their fifth album Ótta was released by Season of Mist in 2014, and was noted for its additional experimental elements like strings and piano. Three official music videos were released and the band performed Iceland's national television channel, RÚV's Stúdio Á.

In January 2015, the band announced that longtime drummer Guðmundur Óli Pálmason had left the band for "personal reasons". Guðmundur replied immediately via the band's Twitter account, explaining that he had been "stonewalled by ex-bandmates" and forced out of the band by Aðalbjörn Tryggvason. Guðmundur was replaced by Hallgrímur Jón Hallgrímsson.
After his departure from the band Guðmundur formed post metal band Katla. 

Sólstafir released their sixth full-length album, Berdreyminn, in May 2017 on Season of Mist. Upon its release Berdreyminn entered international charts, mostly top 50, across Europe.

On November 6th 2020, Sólstafir released their seventh studio album, Endless Twilight of Codependent Love.

Members

Current
 Aðalbjörn "Addi" Tryggvason – guitar, vocals 
 Svavar "Svabbi" Austmann – bass 
 Sæþór Maríus "Pjúddi" Sæþórsson – guitar 
 Hallgrímur Jón "Grimsi" Hallgrímsson – drums

Former
 Halldór Einarsson – bass 
 Guðmundur Óli Pálmason – drums

Timeline

Discography

Studio albums
 Í Blóði og Anda, 2002 (Ars Metalli)
 Masterpiece of Bitterness, 2005 (Spinefarm Records)
 Köld, 2009 (Spinefarm Records)
 Svartir Sandar, 2011 (Season of Mist)
 Ótta, 2014 (Season of Mist)
 Berdreyminn, 2017 (Season of Mist)
 Endless Twilight of Codependent Love, 2020 (Season of Mist)

EPs
 Til Valhallar (EP), 1996
 Black Death (EP), 2002
 Ótta (Radio Edit) + Til Valhallar (EP), 2014
 Ótta Sampler EP / Bonus: Live at Hellfest 2014 (EP), 2014
 Tilberi (EP), 2016
 Silfur-Refur (EP), 2017

Demos
 Í Norðri (demo), 1995
 Promo Tape September 1997 (demo), 1997
 Black Death (demo), 2001
 Promo 2004 (demo), 2004

Singles
 2011: "Fjara"
 2012: "Æra"
 2013: "Þín orð"
 2014: "Ótta"

Splits/compilations
 "Fire & Ice - An Icelandic Metal Compilation" (Compilation), 1997
 "Fjara/Runaway Train" (Split with Legend), 2014

References

External links

 
 
 

Icelandic black metal musical groups
Icelandic post-rock groups
Musical groups established in 1994
Musical quartets
Viking metal musical groups
Post-metal musical groups
Season of Mist artists